Abbreviated dialing is the use of a very short digit sequence to reach specific telephone numbers, such as those of public services. The purpose of such numbers is to be universal, short, and easy to remember. Typically they are two or three digits.

Carriers refer to the shortened number sequences as abbreviated dialing codes (ADCs). Unlike SMS shortcodes, they are generally not automatically synchronized across carriers.  ADCs are provisioned separately for mobile networks versus landline networks.

Examples
The most commonly known examples are emergency telephone numbers such as 9-9-9, 1-1-2 and 9-1-1.  Other services may also be available through abbreviated dialing numbers, such as the other of the eight N11 codes of the North American Numbering Plan (NANP) besides 9-1-1.  State highway departments in recent years have used abbreviated dialing codes to allow drivers to obtain information about road conditions or to reach the state highway patrol.  Examples are *55 in Missouri and Oklahoma, or *FHP which connects to the Florida Highway Patrol. In December 2019, the Federal Communications Commission proposed making 9-8-8 a national number in the United States for the National Suicide Prevention Lifeline.

Security
Privileged group-number, system-number, and enhanced-number lists provide access to numbers that typically would be restricted.

Similar concepts
For text messaging, the technical equivalent is a short code; however, these are rented by their private users rather than being universal and for public services.

Vertical service codes may also be considered as abbreviated dialing, though these are often prefixed by the special touch-tone characters *  and # (or often 11 for pulse dialing) instead of using only numerals.  Most are used to access calling features rather than a called party, and some are specific to each telephone company.  Some are used only locally or regionally (such as *FHP (*347) to reach the Florida Highway Patrol); other codes as short as one numeral (like *1) are used to report breaking news or traffic to the newsrooms of local news radio or TV stations.

A mobile dial code (MDC) is a phone number, typically preceded by a * or #, that allows the request and receipt of information directly to a mobile phone. MDCs are also known in carrier terminology as "abbreviated dialing codes" (ADCs).  Mobile dial codes are dialed just like a regular telephone number. The caller can be presented with any one of a variety of responses that an advertiser defines: a voice or IVR call, a text message, a video or audio clip, a mobile coupon, game or an application.

These types of dialing options can be used for a number of things. "Pound two-fifty" (#250) is an MDC commonly used in radio & TV advertising. Callers are able to dial #250 for a voice-activated, hands-free connection to a business. Callers are prompted to say a keyword or key-phrase, which corresponds to an advertiser (e.g., "Food For The Poor" causes a connection to that non-profit charity). #250 is the only MDC that is functional on all significant mobile carriers in the US and Canada, including Verizon, AT&T, T-Mobile, Sprint, U.S. Cellular, cSpire and several smaller regional carriers (in Canada, on Rogers, Bell Mobility, Telus, Freedom Mobile, Eastlink, Sasktel, Fido, and Videotron).

See also
 Crisis hotline
 Enhanced 9-1-1
 Federal Communications Commission (FCC) (United States)
 In case of emergency
 Next Generation 9-1-1
 Social services
 Speed dial

References

External links 

FCC fact sheet on 2-1-1
2-1-1 Information & Referral Search
Wireless 9-1-1 Services Guide Federal Communications Commission (FCC)
How to Use 9-1-1 from KidsHealth
Emergency Numbers Around the World from 911dispatch.com

Telephone numbers